Max Simon Ehrlich (October 10, 1909 – February 11, 1983) was an American writer. He is best known for the novel The Reincarnation of Peter Proud and the movie of the same name.

Biography

Early life and education
Max Simon Ehrlich was born in Springfield, Massachusetts on October 10, 1909 to Simon and Sarah Ehrlich. He received a B.A. degree from the University of Michigan in 1933.

Career
Ehrlich began his career in newspapers, working as a correspondent for the Albany, New York Knickerbocker Press and Evening News during his college years, then after graduating as a feature writer for the Springfield, Massachusetts Republican. From there he turned to radio, working as the chief writer of the script division of WSPR in 1938 and 1939, in the script division of the American Jewish Committee from 1939 to 1941, and from 1941 to 1945 he was the assistant script director of the radio division of the American Red Cross.

After 1945, Ehrlich was a novelist, playwright, radio and TV dramatist, and author of adaptations for radio, television, and feature films. He wrote radio scripts for series including The Big Story, The Shadow, Big Town, Mr. and Mrs. North, and Murder at Midnight. His television work included scripts for the series Barney Blake, The Big Story, The Defenders, The Nurses, The United States Steel Hour, and Star Trek (episode "The Apple"). Three of his feature film scripts (listed below) were adaptations of his own novels.

Marriage and children
Ehrlich married and had two daughters. One daughter, Amy Ehrlich, is a writer of books for children.

Death 
Ehrlich died on February 11, 1983.

Published books
The Big Eye (Doubleday, 1949)
Spin the Glass Web (Harper & Brothers, 1952)
First Train to Babylon (Harper, 1955)
The Takers (Harper, 1961)
Deep is the Blue (Doubleday, 1964)
The High Side (Fawcett Publications, 1970)
The Edict (Doubleday, 1971)
The Reincarnation of Peter Proud (Bobbs-Merrill, 1974)
The Savage is Loose (Bantam Books, 1974)
The Cult (Simon & Schuster, 1978)
Reincarnation in Venice (Simon & Schuster, 1979)
Naked Beach (Granada, 1979) 
The Big Boys (Houghton Mifflin, 1981)
Shaitan (Arbor House, 1981)

Filmography

Films

Television

Awards
1944: Writers' War Board Award
1963: Huntington Hartford Foundation Fellowship

References

External links

 

 

1909 births
1983 deaths
American science fiction writers
20th-century American novelists
University of Michigan alumni
20th-century American dramatists and playwrights
American male novelists
American male dramatists and playwrights
20th-century American male writers
People from Springfield, Massachusetts
Writers from Massachusetts